Bernice Bowles "Fitz" Fitz-Gibbon (September 6, 1894 – February 22, 1982) was an American advertising executive and a pioneer in retail advertising, working at Marshall Field's, Macy's, Gimbels and Wanamaker's. She was inducted into the Advertising Hall of Fame in 1982. She was named #62 on the 100 people of the 20th century by Advertising Age. She was also honored by Retail Advertising Confederation and the Copywriters Club of New York.

Fitz-Gibbon was born in Waunakee, Wisconsin and grew up on a farm. She earned a degree from University of Wisconsin–Madison, then worked at small newspapers before taking a position at Marshall Field's. She moved to New York City in 1926 to work on the Macy's account, where she penned the tagline "It's smart to be thrifty." While working at Gimbel's from 1940 to 1954, she wrote "Nobody, but nobody, undersells Gimbels." At Gimbels, Fitz-Gibbon was known for her "Fitzkreigs," described as "a blitz of words springing from the rapier-sharp and highly imaginative brain of Miss Fitz-Gibbon."

She married Herman Block in 1925; he died in 1951. She continued her ascendancy and got into a notable feud with author Sloan Wilson over women in the workplace. After receiving numerous industry awards and starting her own firm, Fitz-Gibbon retired to Madison, Wisconsin in 1976. She died in Onalaska, Wisconsin.

Selected bibliography
Alice in Lark Land. Studebaker Corporation (1962) ASIN B0007HL9HO
Girl meets Lark. Studebaker Corporation (1963) ASIN B0007HL9HY
Macy's, Gimbels, and Me: How to Earn $90,000 a Year in Retail Advertising.	 Simon and Schuster (1967) ASIN B000J0NEYU

References

External links
Bernice Fitz-Gibbon profile
Bernice Fitz-Gibbon profile via Advertising Age|95797558

1894 births
1982 deaths
American advertising executives
20th-century American businesswomen
20th-century American businesspeople
People from Waunakee, Wisconsin
People from Madison, Wisconsin
Women in advertising